"The Sound of Musik" is a song by Austrian musician Falco, released as the lead single from his fourth studio album, Emotional (1986). It was written by Falco and Dutch music producers Bolland & Bolland.

Charts

Weekly charts

Year-end charts

References

1986 songs
1986 singles
A&M Records singles
Falco (musician) songs
German-language songs
Songs about music
Songs written by Falco (musician)
Songs written by Ferdi Bolland
Songs written by Rob Bolland